Kalbographa is a genus of lichen-forming fungi in the family Graphidaceae. The genus was circumscribed in 2007 by lichenologist Robert Lücking  with Kalbographa caracasana assigned as the type species. The genus name honours German lichenologist Klaus Kalb.

Species
Kalbographa cabbalistica 
Kalbographa caracasana 
Kalbographa hypoglaucoides 
Kalbographa lobata 
Kalbographa lueckingii 
Kalbographa miniata

References

Graphidaceae
Lichen genera
Taxa described in 2007
Ostropales genera
Taxa named by Robert Lücking